Jonathan Vosselman (born 14 June 1984 in Amsterdam, Netherlands) is a professional football defender who formerly played for Go Ahead Eagles.

He made his debut for Go Ahead Eagles in 1–0 win over De Graafschap on 11 August 2006. Vosselman played 36 games in the 2007–08 season. In the 2008–09 season he played also 36 games.

In July 2011, Vosselman moved to SC Cambuur on a two-year contract. He left the club in January 2013 after losing his chance of play time.

External links
Vosselman profile and statistic at soccernet

1984 births
Living people
Dutch footballers
Go Ahead Eagles players
SC Cambuur players
Footballers from Amsterdam
Be Quick '28 players
Association football defenders